North Loup may refer to:

North Loup, Nebraska
North Loup Township, Nebraska

See also
North Loup River, Nebraska